Austraeolis stearnsi is a species of sea slug, an aeolid nudibranch, a marine gastropod mollusc in the family Facelinidae.

Description
The length of the body attains 25 mm.

Distribution
This species was described from California. and Mexico.

References

Facelinidae
Gastropods described in 1901